Gingras is a French Canadian form of the original French surname Gingreau. Notable people with the surname include:

 André Gingras (1966–2013), Canadian dancer and choreographer
 François-Pierre Gingras (born 1947), Canadian sociologist, political scientist, and author of books for young readers
 Gaston Gingras (born 1959), Canadian ice hockey defensemen
 Gustave Gingras (1918–1996), Canadian physician
 Maxime Gingras (ice hockey) (born 1978), Canadian ice hockey player
 Mireille Gingras (born 1971), American-based Canadian neurobiologist and entrepreneur
 Pierre Gingras, Canadian politician
 René Gingras (born 1938), Canadian politician
 Tony Gingras (1876–1937), Canadian ice hockey right winger

French-language surnames
Surnames of French origin